Zoran Talić (born 23 June 1990) is a Paralympic athlete from Croatia who competes in T20 classification long jump events. Talić represented Croatia at the 2012 Summer Paralympics in London, where he won silver in the long jump. He is also a multiple medal winner at both the IPC World and European Championships, and is a two time European champion in his T20 classification.

References 

Paralympic athletes of Croatia
Athletes (track and field) at the 2012 Summer Paralympics
Athletes (track and field) at the 2016 Summer Paralympics
Paralympic silver medalists for Croatia
Living people
Sportspeople from Rijeka
1990 births
Croatian male long jumpers
Medalists at the 2012 Summer Paralympics
Medalists at the 2016 Summer Paralympics
Paralympic medalists in athletics (track and field)
20th-century Croatian people
21st-century Croatian people